Great Stukeley Railway Cutting is a  biological Site of Special Scientific Interest in Huntingdon in Cambridgeshire.

The site is on the verges of a stretch of the East Coast Main Line north of Huntingdon railway station. It is calcareous clay grassland which has plants which were formerly common on the Huntingdonshire claylands, but are now scarce due to agricultural use. Rabbit grazing and occasional burning maintain the habitat.

There is no public access but the site can be viewed from bridges.

References

Sites of Special Scientific Interest in Cambridgeshire
Railway cuttings in the United Kingdom
East Coast Main Line